Jack Forrest may refer to:

Jack Forrest (footballer, born 1878) (1878–?), Scottish footballer
Jack Forrest (footballer, born 1892) (1892–?), English footballer
Jack Forrest (judge), Australian judge
Jack Forrest (rugby league) (1924–2016), New Zealand rugby league player
John F. Forrest (1927–1997), nicknamed Jack, American soldier

See also 
John Forrest (disambiguation)